Abdurrahim Kuzu (born 20 September 1955) is a Turkish and American former wrestler who competed in the 1984 Summer Olympics.

References

External links
 

1955 births
Living people
Olympic wrestlers of the United States
Wrestlers at the 1984 Summer Olympics
American male sport wrestlers